Huaijiao Wan is a blackish-brown pill used in Traditional Chinese medicine to "arrest bleeding by reducing heat from blood in treating hematochezia". It tastes bitter and astringent. It is used where there is "hematochezia, hemorrhoidal swelling and pain". The binding agent is a water-honey solution. Each pill weighs about 6 grams.

Chinese classic herbal formula

See also
 Chinese classic herbal formula
 Bu Zhong Yi Qi Wan

References

Traditional Chinese medicine pills